Sam Messer (born 1955), is a painter living in Brooklyn, New York with his wife, film writer and director Eleanor Gaver, and daughter. He is Professor Emeritus at the Yale School of Art.

He has painted numerous paintings of the author Paul Auster's typewriter (The Story of My Typewriter).

Messer's animation titled Denis the Pirate was featured in a Matrix Gallery exhibit in the Fall of 2017 at the Wadsworth Atheneum in Hartford, Connecticut. In 2019, Messer will show work in Strange Loops at Artspace, curated by Federico Solmi and Johannes DeYoung.

References 

20th-century American painters
American male painters
21st-century American painters
Living people
Yale School of Art faculty
1955 births
20th-century American male artists